Levan Silagadze (born 4 August 1976) is a former football defender from Georgia.

From 1992 to 1997, he played for the Rustavi clubs Imedi, Azoti and Gorda. In 1997, he was bought by Latvian champion team Skonto FC, who had a Georgian coach Revaz Dzodzuashvili. As Dzodzuashvili left the club in 1999, the future of Silagadze became uncertain, but he rejoined his old coach in various loan moves. In 2001, he played his last cap to date with the Georgian national team, having played 21 times in total since 1997. A somewhat unsuccessful spell in Russian team Rubin Kazan between 2002 and 2003 (despite winning the Russian league bronze in 2003) was followed by a transfer to Dinamo Tbilisi. In summer 2008, he moved to Standard Baku in Azerbaijan.

External links 
GeorgianSoccer.com

1976 births
Living people
Footballers from Georgia (country)
Expatriate footballers from Georgia (country)
Expatriate footballers in Latvia
Expatriate footballers in Russia
Expatriate footballers in Azerbaijan
Russian Premier League players
Skonto FC players
FC Spartak Vladikavkaz players
FC Rubin Kazan players
FC Dinamo Tbilisi players
Georgia (country) international footballers
Expatriate sportspeople from Georgia (country) in Latvia
FK Standard Sumgayit players
Expatriate sportspeople from Georgia (country) in Azerbaijan
FC Metalurgi Rustavi players
FC Lokomotivi Tbilisi players
FC Torpedo Kutaisi players
FC Dinamo Sukhumi players
FC Merani Tbilisi players
FC Sioni Bolnisi players
Association football defenders
People from Rustavi
Expatriate sportspeople from Georgia (country) in Russia
Expatriate sportspeople from Georgia (country) in Israel
Expatriate sportspeople from Georgia (country) in Ukraine
Expatriate footballers in Ukraine
Expatriate footballers in Israel
Erovnuli Liga players